Amrita Institute of Medical Sciences (AIMS), also known as Amrita Hospital, is a super-speciality quaternary care health centre and medical school in Kochi, India. It is one of the largest medical facilities in the country with a total built-up area of over 3.33 million sq.ft, spread over 125 acres of land. It is a 1,350-bed hospital which supports an annual patient volume of about 800,000 outpatients and 50,000 inpatients. It was inspired by Mata Amritanandamayi and inaugurated on 17 May 1998 by the then Prime Minister, Atal Bihari Vajpayee. The Mata Amritanandamayi Math is its parent organisation. Ron Gottsegen is the executive director and Prem Nair is the medical director of AIMS. Dr.(Col). Vishal Marwaha is the Principal/Dean of AIMS.

AIMS is part of the Health Sciences campus of Amrita Vishwa Vidyapeetham (Amrita University). The hospital has received the ISO 9001:2008 accreditation and also enjoys accreditation from the National Accreditation Board for Testing and Calibration Laboratories (NABL) for its laboratories and the National Accreditation Board for Hospitals and Healthcare Providers NABH for the hospital overall. In April 2022, Amrita School of Medicine was ranked the eighth best medical college in India by the Ministry of Human Resource Development in their annual NIRF rankings.

Overview
Amrita Institute of Medical Science (AIMS) offers facilities comprising 31 modern operating theatres, 275 equipped intensive care beds, a fully computerised and networked Hospital Information System (HIS), a fully digital radiology department, a 24/7 telemedicine service and a clinical laboratory. The healthcare infrastructure has a built-up area of 3.33 million sq. ft and is spread across 125 acres of land. The hospital has 17 Centres of Excellence and 29 Speciality Departments supported by 670 faculty members and 4,000 support staff. 

The foundation stone for a second Amrita Hospital in Faridabad, Haryana was laid on May 9, 2016 to serve the Delhi National Capital Region. With 2,400 beds and 81 speciality departments, it will be India's largest private hospital. The new facility will open on August 24, 2022.

Facilities

 Total beds: 1,350
 Total intensive care beds: 275
 Total inpatients per year: 50,000
 Total outpatients per year: 800,000
 Total operation theatres: 31
 Total robotic surgery procedures: 3871
 Total organ transplants: 2148

Research and development

Development of nanomedicine with ability to kill drug resistant cancer
On 16 October 2012, AIMS announced that it had developed a nanomedicine for treating drug resistant cancer cells for Leukaemia(Blood Cancer).

Awards

National Healthcare Excellence Award 2013
In December 2013, the Federation of Indian Chambers of Commerce and Industry (FICCI) awarded AIMS with the ‘National Healthcare Excellence Award 2013’ for the best hospital in the country. The award is in recognition of the hospital's outstanding work toward the "betterment of healthcare" and its efficient and timely service.

National Healthcare Excellence Awards 2016
In September 2016, the Federation Of India Chamber Of Commerce & Industry (FICCI) awarded AIMS with two 'Nation Healthcare Excellence Awards'. AIMS won the awards for the categories of  'Patient Safety' and 'Innovation in Medical Technology.'  The 'Innovation in Medical Technology' award was accepted by Dr. Mahesh Kappanayil for developing a 3D printing model in congenital heart surgery.  The 'Patient Safety' award was accepted by  Dr. Sanjeev Singh for his work on patient safety and antibiotic stewardship.

Controversies

Nurses' strike demanding wage hike
In December 2011, nurses at the Amrita Institute of Medical Sciences and Research Centre went on strike against the hospital management, demanding a wage hike. This was part of a series of statewide strikes by nurses throughout Kerala. The strike was called when leaders of the United Nurses' Association claimed that they were beaten by members of the hospital staff. Later, police was summoned to stop the protests, and they resorted to batons to disperse the protestors. Management claimed that the operations would not be affected even if the nurses continued their indefinite strike. They stated that hundreds of nursing graduates who were Amritanandamayi's devotees were waiting to server patients at the hospital. Finally a consensus was reached between the hospital management and the protestors, wherein the charges against the protestors would be withdrawn by the hospital management and their demand for wage hike would be considered.

Allegation of illegal drug trials

In August 2012 Indiavision television channel reported that the Amrita Institute of Medical Sciences and Research Centre and many hospitals in Kerala were testing new drugs on patients selected through free medical camps. Kerala minister for health, V. S. Sivakumar said the incident would be investigated. The accusations against the hospital were subsequently found to be false.

Rankings

Amrita Institute of Medical Sciences was ranked 8 among medical college in India by NIRF in 2022.

See also
 List of medical colleges in India

References

External links

 AIMS hospital website

Hospitals in Kochi
Research institutes in Kochi
Medical colleges in Kochi
Universities and colleges affiliated with the Mata Amritanandamayi Math
Educational institutions established in 1998
1998 establishments in Kerala
Colleges affiliated with the Kerala University of Health Sciences
Hospitals established in 1998